Crawford's Advertising Agency, formally WS Crawford Ltd, was one of the most important British advertising agencies of the first half of the 20th century. It was responsible for introducing a highly visual style more influenced by European artistic movements such as modernism and futurism than by traditional American marketing techniques. The agency owed its success largely to two men, its founder Sir William Crawford and the legendary art director Ashley Havinden. Between them they exerted an enormous influence on British advertising from the early 1920s until the end of the 1950s.

History
W. S. Crawford Ltd was established in High Holborn, London, in 1914. During the 1920s it moved to larger premises and remained there until 1972 when it relocated to Westbourne Terrace. These premises were shared with Dorland Advertising as a result of their financial merger in 1967. 

W. S. (later Sir William) Crawford built a large part of his reputation on his contributions to official and government publicity campaigns and he was Chairman of the 'Buy British Campaign' of the 1930s. He was succeeded as chairman of the agency in 1950 by Sir Hubert Oughton, a director since 1929, who continued until 1968. He was also President of the IIPA (Institute of Incorporated Practitioners in Advertising, the forerunner of the Institute of Practitioners in Advertising) and AA and an important figure in NABS. In 1968 Sir Hubert Houghton was succeeded as Chairman by Malcolm Ashworth who is credited as saving the agency from financial collapse.

Ashley Havinden (1903-1973) joined Crawford as a trainee in 1922 and was promoted to art director in 1929, a post he held until 1967. Ashley's modernist typography and style influenced by cubism, futurism and The Bauhaus led to the agency's further success and progressive reputation during the 1920s and 1930s. Amongst these were Chrysler motors, the GPO, Simpson's department store, and Eno's fruit salts. Ashley worked with account executive Margaret Sangster (later his wife) and copywriter G.H. Saxon-Mills.

Stefan Schwarzkopf has claimed that Sir William Crawford's advertising agency in London became a pioneer in promoting the social, cultural and economic role of this new group of agency workers, and that it became the first advertising agency that carved out a unique position within a highly competitive market by defining its visual production and organisational identity entirely through notions of creativity. Schwarzkopf argues that this places Crawford's, "at the heart of the emergence of a cultural economy for which creative skills are a paramount source of value creation".

Chairmen
Sir William S Crawford (1914-1950)
 Sir Hubert Oughton (1950-1968)
Malcolm S W Ashworth (1968-70)

Managing directors
Malcolm S W Ashworth (1964-1967)
Florence Sangster (1940s)

Art directors
Ashley Havinden (from 1920s)

Creatives
Stuart Rose
Derek Birdsall, typographer, (1950s)
Rodney Thomas (1920s) 982.html
Nigel Snell, visualiser (1950s)
Desmond  Skirrow (1950s)
Elizabeth Smart, copywriter (1950s)
Hans Schleger (1930s)
Edward McKnight Kauffer (1927-1934)
Godfrey Hope Saxon Mills, copywriter (1920s-40s)
Bob Chudley, founder of Letraset (1950s)
Graham Oakley (1960-62)
Philip Thompson (1950s-60s)
Michael Whittlesea RWS (1950s)
Nicolas Bentley (from 1920s)
Ronald Alan Wilkinson (1960's)
Robin (Buz) Busbridge (Visualiser from 1958-1964) Worked on The Scotsman, Vauxhall, British Aluminium, Shell Chemicals, Robinson Cleaver, Army and Navy and many more under Studio Head Tony Marshall.

References

1914 establishments in the United Kingdom
Defunct marketing companies of the United Kingdom